Yolanda Andrade (born Yolanda Josefina Andrade Gómez; December 28, 1970) is a Mexican actress and television presenter born in Culiacán, Sinaloa. Her career started at the telenovela Yo no creo en los hombres (1991), along with Gabriela Roel and Alfredo Adame, which allowed her to work in bigger productions such as Las secretas intenciones (1992) with Cristian Castro.

Biography

Andrade was born Yolanda Josefina Andrade Gómez on December 28, 1970 in Culiacán, Sinaloa, Mexico After completing high school there, she moved to Mexico City started acting studies at CEA (Centro de Educación Artística) in Televisa for 3 years. Upon completion of her acting studies, she obtained her first role in a soap opera Yo no creo en los hombres. Her next role was as Larissa in Las Secretas Intenciones acting next to Cristian Castro, for which she obtained a TVyNovelas award as best young actress.

She then continued towards other soap operas until she obtained a leading role.  Her first starring role was in Buscando el Paraíso (1993) with Karla Alvares and Alex Ibarra, then Retrato de Familia (1995); Sentimientos Ajenos (1996) with Carlos Ponce and Chantal Andere, Los Hijos de Nadie (1997) with Silvia Derbez and Ramón Abascal. On that same year she also participated in the Mexican movie ¿Quién Diablos es Juliette?.

Along her career, "Joe" -as her friends know her- earned the sympathy of the public and also the media, which gave her with various awards as best actriz.

On March 1, 2000, Yolanda hosted the TV show Hijas de la Madre Tierra with her friend Montserrat Oliver. The show was very successful and they even did a special transmission from the 2000 Olympics in Sydney, Australia

Like many other Mexican celebrities, in 2003 she entered Big Brother VIP where she won second place after the winner Omar Chaparro.

Television

Soap operas 
1997: Los hijos de nadie  -  Lucila
1996: Sentimientos Ajenos - Sofia
1995: Retrato de Familia  -  Elvira
1994: Buscando el Paraiso  -  Dalia
1993: Las Secretas Intenciones  -  Larissa
1991: Yo no creo en los hombres  - Clara

Drama shows 
1995: Mujer, casos de la vida real - El Lugar Ideal
1994: Mujer, casos de la vida real - Perdon por Amor

Reality shows 
2002: Big Brother VIP  - as herself

Variety shows 
2007: Mojoe  - as herself
2006: Netas Divinas  - as herself
2005: Otro Rollo  - as herself
2003: Gran Musical  - as herself
2003: Las Hijas de la Madre Tierra  - as herself

References

 Yolanda's Biography

1970 births
Living people
Mexican telenovela actresses
Mexican television actresses
20th-century Mexican actresses
Mexican television talk show hosts
Actresses from Sinaloa
People from Culiacán